Peter Sommer Christensen (born 28 August 1974 in Skanderborg) is a Danish singer and songwriter. His lyrics are often characterized by interesting puns and word plays. Besides his solo career, he was in the duo Superjeg with Carsten Valentin Lassen, and is currently part of the duo De Eneste To alongside Simon Kvamm.

In duo Superjeg
In the early 2000s, Peter Sommer and Carsten Valentin Lassen formed the pop rock duo Superjeg. Sommer was lead vocals and also played bass, whereas Lassen played guitar and keyboards. The duo utilized many double meanings and puns in their musical output and released two albums: Alt er ego in 2002 and Øst/Vest in 2003, both on the label Auditorium (2). The duo has never officially disbanded, but they have not produced any content together since.

Solo
In 2004, Peter Sommer released his debut solo album, På den anden side, which cracked the Top 5 in Denmark. The single "Valby Bakke" was selected as Ugens Uundgåelige (week's pick), a label given to rising artists by Danish radio station P3; however, it never charted. In 2006, his follow-up album Destruktive vokalerwon him a prize from Statens Kunstfond (the Danish Arts Foundation), and, in 2007, won the title of "Danish Pop Album of the Year".
In 2008, he released his album Til rotterne, til kragerne, til hundene, which came with his first charting single "Rødt kort" and, in 2009, earned the title of "Danish Rock Album of the Year". Sommer won "Danish Male Artist of the Year" and "Danish Songwriter of the Year" at the 2009 Danish Music Awards. His album producer Henrik Balling won Producer of the Year for his work with Sommer.

In duo De Eneste To

In 2010, Peter Sommer formed the duo De Eneste To with Simon Kvamm. In the same year, the duo released their self-titled album De eneste to, which topped Tracklisten, the Danish Albums Chart. At following concerts, they announced that they would be taking a short break, marking the end of the "first chapter". At the same time, they promised to be back in 3–4 years with new material and a new album. Keeping their promise, Dobbeltliv was released in 2014, peaking at #3 on the Danish Albums Chart.

Personal life
Peter Sommer was married to Lise Westzynthius. They had a son, Ivan, together, and later divorced.

Discography

Albums
Solo

with Superjeg

with De Eneste To

Singles
Solo

with De Eneste To

References

External links
Official website

1974 births
Living people
People from Skanderborg Municipality
21st-century Danish male  singers